Nothura  is a genus of birds in the tinamou family. This genus comprises five members of this South American family.

Tinamous are paleognaths related to the flightless ratites. They are probably close in appearance to the flying ancestors of the ratites.

Species

The species in taxonomic order are:
 †N. paludosa Mercerat 1897
 †N. parvula (Brodkorb 1963) Tambussi 1989 [Cayeornis parvulus Brodkorb 1963]
 Nothura boraquira, white-bellied nothura, located in northeastern and central Brazil, eastern Bolivia, and northeastern Paraguay
 Nothura minor, lesser nothura, located in the interior of southeastern Brazil
 Nothura darwinii, Darwin's nothura, located in southern Peru, western Bolivia, and southern and western Argentina
 Nothura darwinii darwinii located in south central Argentina
 Nothura darwinii peruviana located in southern Peru
 Nothura darwinii agassizii located in southeastern Peru and western Bolivia
 Nothura darwinii boliviana located in western Bolivia
 Nothura darwinii salvadorii located in western Argentina
 Nothura maculosa, spotted nothura, located in Argentina, Paraguay, Uruguay, eastern and southern Brazil
 Nothura maculosa maculosa located in southern Brazil, Uruguay, eastern Paraguay, and northeastern Argentina
 Nothura maculosa major located in the interior of east central Brazil
 Nothura maculosa nigroguttata located in south central Argentina
 Nothura maculosa cearensis located in northeastern Brazil
 Nothura maculosa paludivaga located in central Paraguay and north central Argentina
 Nothura maculosa annectens located in eastern Argentina
 Nothura maculosa submontana located in southwestern Argentina
 Nothura maculosa pallida located in northwestern Argentina
 Nothura maculosa chacoensis, Chaco nothura, located in northwestern Paraguay and north central Argentina

Footnotes

References
 
 
 
ITIS

 
Bird genera